The Tamsui Historical Museum is a museum in Tamsui District, New Taipei, Taiwan.

History
The museum building used to be the British consulate. The museum was established in 2005 by the Taipei County Government.

Transportation
The museum is accessible within walking distance northwest of Tamsui Station of Taipei Metro.

See also
 List of museums in Taiwan

References

External links
 

2005 establishments in Taiwan
Museums established in 2005
Museums in New Taipei